Hum ol Din (also Romanized as Ḩūm ol Dīn and Ḩūm od Dīn; also known as  Ḩāmedīn, Ḩām od Dīn, and Ḩūmedīn) is a village in Raviz Rural District, Koshkuiyeh District, Rafsanjan County, Kerman Province, Iran. At the 2006 census, its population was 306, in 80 families.

References 

Populated places in Rafsanjan County